Energlyn & Churchill Park railway station is a railway station in Caerphilly, Wales, on the Rhymney Line. The northbound platform is in the Energlyn suburb of Caerphilly, whilst the southbound one is in Churchill Park.

The first services from the station ran on 8 December 2013. The station was formally opened on 16 December 2013 by Edwina Hart, the Welsh Government Transport Minister.

History

The provision of a station on the Rhymney Line at Energlyn was raised in January 2001 when Sue Essex AM was reported to have instructed that £16 million should be set aside for works to improve capacity on the line, including a new station. The failure of Railtrack delayed the project, which was next mentioned in Network Rail's Wales Route Utilisation Strategy for Control Period 4 (2009-2014). The station would serve new housing around Energlyn and Churchill Park, as well as Pwllypant, Penyrheol, Abertridwr and Bedwas. The population in the area is large enough to warrant a station but it is thought unlikely that patronage on the Rhymney Line will dramatically increase, as many potential passengers already use neighbouring stations.

In December 2008, Sewta submitted a £350 million five-year spending programme to the Welsh Government which included £38.7 million for works on the Rhymney Line, including Energlyn station. Plans for the station were put on hold when the works were not included in the Government's spending plans for 2011-2012, the reason given being the spending cuts imposed by the UK Coalition government. The project was, however, identified as a priority in the Welsh Government’s National Transport Plan in January 2012, with a projected completion date in 2015.

The design for the station was unveiled by Network Rail on 9 February 2012. It comprises two six-car length platforms with step-free access, parking for 17 cars including disabled spaces, a drop-off point, CCTV, waiting shelters, ticket machines, a bicycle storage area, emergency help points and train information displays. The design was developed jointly by the Welsh Assembly Government, Network Rail, Caerphilly County Borough Council, Sewta and Arriva Trains Wales. Provision of the new station was scheduled to cost £5.2 million. From opening to October 2018, it was operated by Arriva Trains Wales. Transport for Wales took over operation from October 2018.

Construction
The station was built by a Colas Rail and Morgan Sindall joint venture.

Services
In the December 2016 timetable, the basic daytime service remains two trains per hour each way, to Caerphilly, Cardiff Central &  southbound and to  northbound. This drops to hourly in the evening and two-hourly on Sundays.

References

External links

Railway stations in Caerphilly County Borough
Railway stations in Great Britain opened in 2013
Railway stations served by Transport for Wales Rail
Transport in Caerphilly
Railway stations opened by Network Rail
2013 establishments in Wales